Elizondo is a Basque place-name and surname meaning '(house) beside the church'. It may refer to:

Places
 Elizondo, Navarre, a town in northeast Spain

People with the name
 Domingo Elizondo (died 1783), Spanish soldier in the 18th century
 Everardo Elizondo (born 1943), Mexican economist
 Felicia Elizondo (1946–2021), American transgender activist
 Fernando Elizondo Barragán (born 1949), Mexican senator
 Héctor Elizondo (born 1936), American actor
 Héctor Elizondo (sport shooter) (born 1925), Mexican sport shooter
 Hernán Elizondo Arce (1921–2012), Costa Rican writer
 Horacio Elizondo (born 1963), Argentine football referee
 Ignacio Elizondo (1766–1813), 19th century Mexican general and turncoat
 Laura Elizondo (born 1983), former Miss Mexico who competed for the Miss Universe title
 Luis Elizondo, former US military intelligence officer
 Mike Elizondo, American musician and hip hop producer
 Salvador Elizondo (1932–2006), Mexican writer
 René Elizondo, Jr., a Mexican dancer, songwriter, and music video director
 Ricardo Elizondo Elizondo (1950–2013), Mexican writer
 Rodolfo Elizondo, a Mexican politician
 Virgilio Elizondo (1935–2016), Mexican American, Roman Catholic priest

Basque-language surnames